Electo Wilson (born 19 February 1989 in Budapest) is a Hungarian football player who currently plays for Újpest FC.

References
This article has been written based on the Magyar version of Wikipedia *:hu:Koncz Zsolt
Player profile at HLSZ 

1989 births
Living people
Footballers from Budapest
Hungarian people of Brazilian descent
Hungarian footballers
Association football midfielders
Újpest FC players
Kecskeméti TE players